Scylla (minor planet designation: 155 Scylla) is a main belt asteroid. It was discovered by Austrian astronomer Johann Palisa at the Austrian Naval Observatory on 8 November 1875, and named after the monster Scylla in Greek mythology. Two weeks after its discovery this asteroid became lost and was not recovered for 95 years. It was finally found by Paul Wild of Berne, Switzerland with the aid of an ephemeris created in 1970 by Conrad M. Bardwell at Cincinnati Observatory.

Photometric observations of this asteroid during 2008 at the Organ Mesa Observatory in Las Cruces, New Mexico, gave an asymmetrical, bimodal light curve with a period of 7.9597 ± 0.0001 hours and a brightness variation of 0.46 ± 0.03 in magnitude.

References

External links 
 Asteroid Lightcurve Database (LCDB), query form (info )
 Dictionary of Minor Planet Names, Google books
 Asteroids and comets rotation curves, CdR – Observatoire de Genève, Raoul Behrend
 Discovery Circumstances: Numbered Minor Planets (1)-(5000) – Minor Planet Center
 
 

000155
Discoveries by Johann Palisa
Named minor planets
000155
18751108